Mount Olive is an unincorporated community in Clermont County, in the U.S. state of Ohio.

History
A post office called Mount Olive was established in 1848, and remained in operation until 1907. Besides the post office, Mount Olive had a country store.

References

Unincorporated communities in Clermont County, Ohio
Unincorporated communities in Ohio